Asplenium virens is a species of fern in the family Aspleniaceae. It is endemic to Ecuador, where it is found in coastal forests. This habitat is fragmented and degraded, and habitat loss is the main threat to the species.

References

virens
Ferns of Ecuador
Endemic flora of Ecuador
Ferns of the Americas
Endangered flora of South America
Taxonomy articles created by Polbot